Deroplatyini is a tribe of the subfamily Deroplatyinae of the family Mantidae of Mantodea.

Genera and species
The Mantodea Species File lists the following  genera:
Deroplatys (Westwood, 1839)
 Deroplatys angustata Westwood, 1845
 Deroplatys cordata (Fabricius, 1798)
 Deroplatys desiccata (Westwood, 1839)
 Deroplatys gorochovi (Anisyutkin, 1998)
 Deroplatys indica (Roy, 2007)
 Deroplatys lobata (Guérin-Méneville (1838)
 Deroplatys moultoni (Giglio-Tos, 1917)
 Deroplatys philippinica (Werner, 1922)
 Deroplatys rhombica (Brunner, 1897)
 Deroplatys sarawaca (Westwood, 1889)
 Deroplatys trigonodera (Westwood, 1889)
 Deroplatys truncata (Guerin-Meneville, 1843)
 Mythomantis Giglio-Tos, 1916
 Mythomantis confusa Westwood, 1889
 Mythomantis gracilis Werner, 1922
 Mythomantis serrata Schwarz & Helmkampf, 2014
 Pseudempusa Brunner v. W., 1893
 Pseudempusa pavonina Giglio-Tos, 1916
 Pseudempusa pinnapavonis Brunner, 1893

Note: the genus Brancsikia Saussure & Zehntner, 1895 is now placed in the family Epaphroditidae.

See also
 Dead Leaf Mantis
 List of mantis genera and species

References

Mantidae
Mantodea tribes